Corrado dal Fabbro (sometimes rendered as Corrado Dal Fabbro or Corado dal Fabro; 4 August 1945 – 29 March 2018) was an Italian bobsledder who competed in the late 1960s and early 1970s. He won the silver medal in the four-man event at the 1972 Winter Olympics in Sapporo.

Dal Fabbro also won a silver medal in the two-man event at the 1971 FIBT World Championships in Cervinia.

From 2007 until his death in 2018, he was vice president of Sport for the FIBT.

References

External links
 Bobsleigh four-man Olympic medalists for 1924, 1932-56, and since 1964
 Bobsleigh two-man world championship medalists since 1931
 DatabaseOlympics.com profile
 FIBT Executive Committee as of 2007 - Accessed December 8, 2007

1945 births
2018 deaths
Bobsledders at the 1972 Winter Olympics
Italian male bobsledders
Olympic bobsledders of Italy
Olympic silver medalists for Italy
Olympic medalists in bobsleigh
Medalists at the 1972 Winter Olympics